Barbara Ann Mueller (born May 23, 1933, in Chicago, Illinois) is a retired American track and field athlete. She represented the United States at the 1956 Olympics, running the 80 meters hurdles.  Her 11.6 did not get her out of the heats. A versatile athlete, she won the pentathlon at the US National Championships in 1955 and 1956, both times defeating Stella Walsh. While finishing second to Cuban Bertha Diaz, she was National Champion in the hurdles in 1955 as the first American in the race. She won the 1954 National Indoor Championship in the 50 yard hurdles.  She also ran hurdles in the 1955 and 1959 Pan American Games.

References

Living people
1933 births
Track and field athletes from Chicago
Athletes (track and field) at the 1956 Summer Olympics
American female hurdlers
Athletes (track and field) at the 1959 Pan American Games
Athletes (track and field) at the 1955 Pan American Games
DePaul University alumni
Olympic track and field athletes of the United States
Pan American Games track and field athletes for the United States
21st-century American women
20th-century American women